The dwarf bonneted bat, or Peters' mastiff bat, (Eumops bonariensis), is a bat species from South and Central America.

Description
As its common name implies, E. bonariensis is the smallest species of bonneted bat.

The fur is thick and silky, and ranges from cinnamon to dark chocolate brown, being noticeably paler on the underside of the body. The head has a broad snout with a fringe of stiff hairs on the upper lip, and long, wide, ears connected by a small membrane. The wing membranes are black, but are covered with sparse hairs close to the arms. Males have been observed to have glands on the throat that become enlarged during the breeding season.

Distribution and habitat
Dwarf bonneted bats are found from southern Mexico through the whole of Central America, and in every country of South America except Chile. They inhabit a wide range of environments, from dense rainforest to dry thorny scrub. Up to four subspecies are recognised:

 Eumops bonariensis bonariensis - Uruguay and neighbouring regions of Brazil and Argentina
 Eumops bonariensis beckeri - Peru, southern Brazil, Bolivia, Paraguay, northern Argentina
 Eumops bonariensis delticus - northern Brazil, neighbouring regions of other countries
 Eumops bonariensis nanus - Ecuador, Colombia, Venezuela, the Guyanas, and north to southern Mexico

However, E. b. beckeri is sometimes considered synonymous with the Patagonian bonneted bat.

Biology
Dwarf bonneted bats feed on flying insects, primarily beetles and moths. They roost in small groups of up to twenty individuals, and are often found sleeping in the roofs of buildings. They are rapid fliers, often remaining high above the ground. They often make loud calls that are audible to humans. Breeding has been recorded from March to June in Mexico, and from October to November at the southern end of the bat's range. Females give birth to a single young.

References

Mammals of Colombia
Bats of Central America
Mammals described in 1800
Bats of South America
Taxa named by George Shaw